Tiago Luis Volpi (born 19 December 1990) is a Brazilian professional footballer who plays as a goalkeeper for Liga MX club Toluca.

Career

Early career
Volpi started his career at Fluminense in 2008, before moving to São José a year later, he was loaned to Luverdense in 2011.

Querétaro
On 20 December 2014, Volpi was signed by Mexican club Querétaro.

On 16 January 2015, Volpi made his officially debut with Querétaro against Leones Negros UdeG, Gallos Blancos won 1-0.
The first tournament he played with the team, Volpi, accompanied with Brazilian teammates Ronaldinho, Sinha, William, Danilinho, and Camilo Sanvezzo help the team reach the first final in the franchise history, the team won the second-leg game celebrated in the Corregidora Stadium with a 3-0 final score, but Club Santos Laguna won with an aggregate scoreline of 5-3. The Mexico national team expressed interest in acquiring Volpi for naturalisation, before he left Querétaro.

São Paulo
On 23 December 2018, Volpi returned to Brazil, signing for São Paulo on a one-year loan with an buy-out option.

One year later, on 24 December 2019, São Paulo announced the permanent signing of Volpi, who signed a contract running until December 2023. São Paulo paid US$5 million to mexican side Querétaro for Volpi's permanent transfer.

Toluca
On 14 May 2022, Volpi signed for Toluca, returning to Mexico after three years. He scored a penalty against Santos Laguna on 13 October 2022, that contributed to a 4–3 victory for Toluca.

Honours

Club
Figueirense
Campeonato Catarinense: 2014

Querétaro
Copa MX: Apertura 2016
Supercopa MX: 2017

São Paulo
Campeonato Paulista: 2021

Individual
Campeonato Brasileiro Série A most clean sheets: 2019

References

External links
 
 
 Figueirense 
 

1990 births
Living people
Brazilian footballers
Esporte Clube São José players
Brazilian people of Italian descent
Luverdense Esporte Clube players
Figueirense FC players
São Paulo FC players
Campeonato Brasileiro Série A players
Campeonato Brasileiro Série B players
Campeonato Brasileiro Série C players
Campeonato Brasileiro Série D players
Association football goalkeepers
Querétaro F.C. footballers
Expatriate footballers in Mexico
Brazilian expatriate footballers
People from Blumenau
Sportspeople from Santa Catarina (state)